The murals from the Christian temple at Qocho are three Church of the East mural fragments—Palm Sunday, Repentance and Entry into Jerusalem—discovered by the German Turpan expedition team, which was led by two German archaeologists Albert Grünwedel and Albert von Le Coq, in the early 20th century.

These murals were painted in the 7th to 9th centuries, belonging to a ruined Church of the East church at Qocho in Chinese Turkestan, an ancient oasis city located in present-day Xinjiang, the westernmost region of China. The original Entry into Jerusalem is lost, there is only a copy of line drawing made by Grünwedel. The murals are preserved in the Museum of Asian Art in Dahlem, Berlin.

Description

Palm Sunday
The mural measures 63 cm long and 70 cm wide, shows a man on the left of Near Eastern descent (or more specifically, an Iranian, according to ), presumably a deacon or a priest. He has aquiline nose, the head surrounded by thick black curls is reminiscent of late antique representations. His clothing consists of a white vestment with a green collar, reaching to the feet, over which he wears a shorter garment of white with green cuffs. The plump feet are clad in rugged black shoes. In his left hand he wields a golden thurible, the smoke is represented by a swift upward wavy line that dissolves in spirals at the top. In his right hand he holds a black, bowl-like object, which might be a holy water vessel.

The three figures approaching from the right, two men and a woman with slightly bowed heads, are carrying what might be palm branches. The two men are wearing similar hats and coats with wide revers, hung round the shoulders like capes. The long, unicolour coat, which is brown in the first man, gray-blue in the second, and seems to be worn without a belt. The long sleeves of the coats hang empty and they hold their branches in one hand from within their coats. The first male figure wears a brown, turban-like headgear; the black hair is visible behind the left ear. The second male figure has a large, black and frustoconical hat worn on his head; on the feet both wear brownish coloured shoes.

She wears green shoes with turned-up toes. The dense, black hair is folded at the apex to a spherical structure. The three worshippers may be compared with the figures of Uyghur princes and princesses holding flowers in the cave paintings at Bezeklik.

A donkey's hoof visible at the top of the scene is part of the lost fresco Entry into Jerusalem, this has led to the interpretation that the scene portrays a Palm Sunday rite. The Japanese professor  also considers the mural to be a depiction of Palm Sunday; another Japanese scholar Daijirō Yoshimura argues that the larger figure on the left representing Jesus Christ, the three figures on the right represent Saint Peter, Saint John and Mary Magdalene.

Repentance
This smaller painting measures 43 cm long and 21 cm wide. It represents a young woman in a state of repentance. She is in a long, reddish brown dress with wide, loose sleeves, which conceal the hands folded on the front body. The whitish undergarment reaches to the floor and reveals only the very large, upturned ends of the shoes, which rise up under the hem.

Entry into Jerusalem
This lost wall painting was sketched by Grünwedel in 1905. It depicts a bearded figure (Jesus) mounted on a donkey holding a processional cross with arms terminating in pearls and entering Jerusalem, with a female figure (believer) dressing in the Tang dynasty costume. The cross which the figure holding is similar to the processional cross depicted on a lost Manichean banner from Qocho. The rider has a headdress with a cross set in it and he wears a short upper garment which appears to billow out.

See also
 Bulayïq
 Ancient Arts of Central Asia
 Church of the East in China
 Nestorian pillar of Luoyang
 Painting of a Christian figure

Notes

References

7th-century paintings
8th-century paintings
9th-century paintings
Ancient Central Asian art
Fresco paintings in Germany
Tang dynasty paintings
Jesus in art
Church of the East in China
Lost paintings